Navantia is a Spanish state-owned shipbuilding company, which offers its services to both military and civil sectors. It is the fifth-largest shipbuilder in Europe and the ninth-largest in the world with shipyards around the globe. The heir to the segregation of the military assets of the IZAR Group in 2005, Navantia designs, builds and supports all types of surface vessels, submarines and systems. In addition, it is expanding into new markets diversifying its product, such as renewable energy, the offshore industry and all kinds of services that it requires by the naval industry.

Company

The origins of Navantia go back to the origins of Spanish naval construction, from the 13th century with Alfonso X with the Real Atarazanas de Sevilla and the Real Carenero of San Fernando, which took great relevance during the discovery of America until due to the increase of the size of the ships and their greater draft, in 1730 they were replaced by the historical military Arsenal de Ferrol (A Coruña), Arsenal de Cartagena (Murcia) and La Carraca, (Cádiz), in what supposed a reform of the navy and the beginning of the development of the modern naval industry in Spain under the supervision of the Marques de la Ensenada and Jorge Juan in the times of Felipe V and Fernando VI, whose shipyards were destined to build and repair the ships of the Spanish Navy.

In 1908 these shipyards became part of the Spanish Naval Construction Society (La Naval) to which civil shipyards such as Matagorda in Puerto Real (Cádiz) or Sestao (Vizcaya) also belonged, later integrated into AESA. At the end of the Spanish Civil War, the State took over the military arsenals and in 1947 the Empresa Nacional Bazán was formed, which was born as a shipbuilding company that depended on foreign technology. Subsequently, Bazán began to develop his own ship projects.

IZAR was formed in 2000, as a result of the merger between Astilleros Españoles (AESA), a company that brought together the public civil shipyards and the Empresa Nacional Bazán. In December 2004, the Sociedad Estatal de Participaciones Industriales (SEPI), the largest shareholder and manager of the group, decided to separate the military branch of IZAR, creating in March 2005 the Navantia company, aimed at achieving greater business efficiency, later becoming it also transferred the civil branch. Navantia, the Spanish shipbuilder, 100% owned by SEPI, the Spanish government industrial holding, is engaged in the design, construction and integration of warships, as well as ship repairs and modernizations.

In March 2016, Navantia was selected as the "preferred bidder" to build two logistics support ships for the Royal Australian Navy. In April 2021, Navantia launches its first completely Spanish designed and built submarine, the Issac Peral S-81. This was 133 years after the launch of the first functional war submarine in history, the Peral submarine.

Location 
{
  "type": "FeatureCollection",
  "features": [
    {
      "type": "Feature",
      "properties": {},
      "geometry": {
        "type": "Point",
        "coordinates": [
          -8.352173566818239,
          43.50633064633111
        ]
      }
    },
    {
      "type": "Feature",
      "properties": {},
      "geometry": {
        "type": "Point",
        "coordinates": [
          -6.264771223068237,
          36.55112771635223
        ]
      }
    },
    {
      "type": "Feature",
      "properties": {},
      "geometry": {
        "type": "Point",
        "coordinates": [
          -0.9693610668182374,
          37.6029171657249
        ]
      }
    },
    {
      "type": "Feature",
      "properties": {},
      "geometry": {
        "type": "Point",
        "coordinates": [
          -3.7159430980682377,
          40.46951718646124
        ]
      }
    },
    {
      "type": "Feature",
      "properties": {},
      "geometry": {
        "type": "Point",
        "coordinates": [
          46.75524830818177,
          24.793716412811797
        ]
      }
    },
    {
      "type": "Feature",
      "properties": {},
      "geometry": {
        "type": "Point",
        "coordinates": [
          39.17468190193177,
          21.501119119668008
        ]
      }
    },
    {
      "type": "Feature",
      "properties": {},
      "geometry": {
        "type": "Point",
        "coordinates": [
          151.19128346443176,
          -33.75448810392156
        ]
      }
    }
  ]
}Navantia has 4 main locations in Spain, the Navantia company headquarters are located in Madrid and the production centers are in the following areas:

 Bahía de Cádiz:
 Arsenal de la Carraca in San Fernando (Cádiz).
 Astillero de Puerto Real, in Puerto Real (Cádiz).
 Astillero de Cádiz
 Instalaciones de Rota (Cádiz).
 Navantia Training Center in San Fernando.
 Ría de Ferrol:
 Astillero de Ferrol (A Coruña)
 Astillero de Fene (A Coruña)
 Astillero de Cartagena (Murcia)

Products 
Navantia's activities can be broken down into four main sectors: naval defense, historical core of the group's business (ships, submarines, management of the operational availability of forces), Systems (Research, development and Integration of all kinds of defense systems, surveillance and navigation systems), diversification (renewable marine energy, construction of naval bases and power plants, offshore) and services (Maintenance, repair and life cycle support).

Surface defense 

 Multi-mission frigates: F100, F110, F310, AWD HOBART, ALFA 3000 Y 4000.
 Aircraft Carrier / Multi-Mission LHD:  ATHLAS 26000
 LPD: ATHLAS 13000
 LCM: Arena 65
 Ocean patrol and corvettes:  Avante 300, 1400, 1800, 2200 Combatant, 3000, 2200 Patrol.
 AOR: BAC Cantabria
 AOE con capacidades anfibias: JOINT SUPPORT SHIP

Submarine defense 

 Submarine: S-81

Propulsion 

 Turbines: Navantia manufactures steam turbines and equipment for ships such as reduction gears, rudders, shaft lines, torpedo tubes, etc. for both the civil and military markets. The Navatia Turbine factory installed the first propulsion plant on a ship in 1912 and since then has worked independently or with collaboration agreements with world-class technologists such as General Electric, Mitsubishi Hitachi PS, Siemens, Schelde Gears, etc. Its product catalog includes:
 Equipment such as reduction gears, shaft lines, rudders, gas turbine encapsulation, etc.
 Steam turbines licensed by Mitsubishi Hitachi Power Systems in an approximate power range of 2 to 15 MW for co-generation plants, biomass and other industrial applications
 Components and / or steam turbines in any power range with different technologists
 Support for the Life Cycle that includes repair and / or maintenance, technical assistance, optimization of equipment, spare parts, etc. Navantia has participated in the manufacture and commissioning of steam turbines for the main power generation plants in Spain, such as nuclear and thermal plants, co-generation and biomass plants, as well as other industrial applications.
 Engines: Navantia mainly manufactures high and medium speed four-stroke diesel engines since 1947, present in all markets for all types of applications, naval and land. Its product catalog includes:
 Propulsion equipment for naval application for all types of ships
 Land propulsion equipment for military vehicles
 Generating sets for naval application, for all types of ships
 Generating groups for ground application, for all types of installations
 After-sales service (technical assistance, maintenance, spare parts)
 Training courses for clients in the operation and maintenance of equipment The Navantia Motor factory has the most modern facilities (induction furnaces, CNC machines, more than 5000 square meters of assembly, test benches of up to 10,000 kW…) and works with licenses and technology cooperation agreements with the main companies in the sector, such as MAN Diesel Turbo, MTU Friedrischafen and Caterpillar. For the Spanish Army, Navantia has carried out the re-motorization of the M-60 and AMX-30 battle tanks. It has also supplied propulsion equipment for the Leopard tank and the Pizarro cavalry vehicle.

Offshore 
Navantia is increasingly diversifying its products in the offshore sector, especially in wind energy.

Major projects

Carriers
  carrier (commissioned 1988)
  (1997)
Amphibious assault ships
Juan Carlos I-class LHD and carrier (2010)
Canberra-class LHD (2014)
Galicia-class LPDs (1998, 2000)
Amphibious ships
LCM-1E landing craft

Supply ships
Supply-class replenishment oiler 
Cantabria replenishment oiler (2010)
Patiño replenishment oiler (1995)
Aegis Combat System | AEGIS Frigates
F-100 Álvaro de Bazán-class frigate (2002–12)
F-310 Fridtjof Nansen class (2006–11)
Hobart-class destroyer (2016–19)
Corvettes
AEGIS corvette
Al-Jubail Class (2019-)
Patrol ships
BAM ocean patrol vessels (Spain, 2011–12)
Guaiquerí-class patrol boat (Venezuela, 2011–12)
Guaicamacuto-class patrol boat (Venezuela, 2010–11)
Attack Patrol ships (44 m, 47 m, 63 m)
Oceanic & Coast Patrol ships (79 m, 99 m)
Mantilla-class patrol vessel (Argentina, 1982–83)
Uribe-class patrol vessel (Mexico, 1982–83)
Submarines
 - joint venture with DCNS for export
Isaac Peral-class submarines (S-80A)
Minehunter ships
Oceanographic ships
Combat and Control Systems
Propulsion and energy generation systems
Ship repair and conversions

See also
 Astilleros y Talleres del Noroeste 
 Ferrol, Galicia 
 Fene

References

External links
 
 Spanish shipyards buck global economic crisis

Government-owned companies of Spain
Defence companies of Spain
Shipbuilding companies of Spain
Manufacturing companies based in Madrid